Benjamin Terrence Coates, Jr. (born August 16, 1969) is an American former professional football player who was a tight end in the National Football League (NFL) for 10 seasons, primarily with the New England Patriots. He played college football at Livingstone and was selected by the Patriots in the fifth round of the 1991 NFL Draft, where spent all but one season of his professional career. In his final season, he was a member of the Baltimore Ravens.

During his nine seasons with the Patriots, Coates was a five-time Pro Bowler and two-time first-team All-Pro. He also made one Super Bowl appearance in Super Bowl XXXI. After being released by the Patriots, Coates signed with the Ravens and was part of the team that won Super Bowl XXXV. Coates pursued a coaching career following his retirement, serving as the head coach at his alma mater Livingstone and the tight ends coach for the Cleveland Browns. He was named to the second NFL 1990s All-Decade Team in 2000 and inducted to the New England Patriots Hall of Fame in 2008.

Early years
Coates didn't play football until his senior year at Greenwood High School, and was a multi-sport player at Livingstone College located in Salisbury, North Carolina. As a gridiron player at Livingstone, he broke nearly all meaningful records at the school, but due to his split-sport performances against small-school opponents, he received little notice outside the CIAA. While a college student, he joined Phi Beta Sigma fraternity through the Untouchable Upsilon Chapter at Livingstone College.  He finished his college career with 103 receptions for 1,268 yards and 18 touchdowns.  In 2018, he was inducted into the Central Intercollegiate Athletic Association Hall of Fame.

Professional career
Considered an out-of-nowhere prospect, Coates was picked in the fifth round of the 1991 NFL Draft by the New England Patriots. His first two years with the Patriots were fairly uneventful; in his rookie year he had ten catches for 95 yards and a two-yard touchdown against the Indianapolis Colts that forced overtime in a 23–17 Patriots win. In his second season, he had 20 catches for 171 yards and three touchdowns.

His career changed with the 1993 arrival of quarterback Drew Bledsoe and head coach Bill Parcells to the Patriots franchise. Parcells, known for his reliance on tight ends, frequently used then-rookie quarterback Bledsoe on passes to Coates, and the tight end led the Patriots in receptions in 1993 with 53 catches for 629 yards and eight scores, two of them in New England's season-ending overtime win over Miami.

In 1994, his breakout year, he caught 96 passes, the most ever for a tight end to that point, breaking a record previously set by Todd Christensen in 1986 (the record was later broken by Tony Gonzalez in 2004), for 1,174 yards receiving, the only time in his career he would gain 1,000 yards in a receiving season, while also scoring seven touchdowns. He appeared in his first Pro Bowl and would appear in the next four as well.

In 1996, Coates had 62 catches for 682 yards and nine touchdowns; the most dramatic was against the New York Giants in the final game of the regular season as he caught a 12-yard pass and bulled through Giants defenders for the game-winning score of a 23–22 New England win. His efforts helped New England to a championship appearance in Super Bowl XXXI. His team lost the game, 35–21, but he had a good performance in it, leading the Patriots in receiving with 6 catches for 66 yards and a touchdown. From 1995 to 1998, he caught 84, 62, 66, and 67 passes, respectively, in those four seasons.

After the 1999 season, which saw a significant decline in production, Coates was released by the Patriots. He subsequently played for the Baltimore Ravens, where he climbed the all-time receiving charts and won Super Bowl XXXV in the process. When Coates was released by the Ravens in the following year, he decided to retire, having become the fourth all-time leading receiver at tight end in NFL history, behind Ozzie Newsome, former teammate Shannon Sharpe, and Kellen Winslow. Coates played in 158 games with 499 receptions for 5,555 yards and 50 touchdowns.

After retiring, Coates returned to Livingstone College, where he was head coach, and also coached in NFL Europe. In 2004, he served an internship with the Dallas Cowboys as an assistant for the tight ends, reuniting him with head coach Parcells. In March 2005, Coates was named the tight ends coach for the Cleveland Browns, replacing Rob Chudzinski, under head coach Romeo Crennel, who had been the defensive line coach of the Patriots while Coates was with the team.

It was announced on July 7, 2008, that Coates would be inducted into the New England Patriots Hall of Fame. During his playing days with the Patriots, Coates was a fan favorite and was given the nickname "Winter" (as in "winter coat").

NFL career statistics

References

External links
 New England Patriots bio
 

1969 births
Living people
American football tight ends
Cleveland Browns coaches
Baltimore Ravens players
Frankfurt Galaxy coaches
Livingstone Blue Bears football coaches
Livingstone Blue Bears football players
New England Patriots players
American Conference Pro Bowl players
People from Greenwood, South Carolina
Coaches of American football from South Carolina
Players of American football from South Carolina
African-American coaches of American football
African-American players of American football
21st-century African-American people
20th-century African-American sportspeople